Abel Tshaka Tshakile Nzimande (born November 19, 1961) is a South African sprinter. He competed in the men's 200 metres at the 1992 Summer Olympics.

References

South African male sprinters
1961 births
Living people
Sportspeople from Bloemfontein
Athletes (track and field) at the 1992 Summer Olympics
Olympic athletes of South Africa
20th-century South African people
21st-century South African people